Muhamad Abu Hena (Bengali: মুহাম্মদ আবু হেনা) served as the International Commissioner of the Bangladesh Scouts, as well as the Chairman of the Asia-Pacific Scout Committee.

In 1994, he was awarded the 232nd Bronze Wolf, the only distinction of the World Organization of the Scout Movement, awarded by the World Scout Committee for exceptional services to world Scouting.

References

External links

Recipients of the Bronze Wolf Award
Year of birth missing
Scouting and Guiding in Bangladesh